Fan Yang-shang (born 21 October 1937) is a Taiwanese politician.

Fan attended the Taipei campus of National Chung Hsing University, where he earned a bachelor's degree in sociology. He pursued graduate study in the same subject at Waseda University. Fan worked as a consultant for the World Hakka Federation and was also the director of the Greater New York Hakka Association. In his return to Taiwan, Fan was successively appointed to the Overseas Chinese Affairs Commission, elected to the second National Assembly, and served on the Legislative Yuan from 1999 to 2002. While a member of the Legislative Yuan, Fan represented Overseas Chinese on behalf of the Kuomintang, and served as convenor of the Foreign Affairs Committee.

References

1937 births
Living people
Taiwanese politicians of Hakka descent
Members of the 4th Legislative Yuan
Party List Members of the Legislative Yuan
Waseda University alumni
Taiwanese expatriates in Japan
Taiwanese expatriates in the United States
National Taipei University alumni